Jesper Jenset (born 19 August 1997) is a Norwegian singer and songwriter. He rose to prominence after finishing fifth in the Norwegian edition of Pop Idol, entitled Idol - Jakten på en superstjerne in 2014, which led him to sign a record deal with Sony Music. Jenset has since released three extended plays; Waves, Vol. 1, Waves, Vol. 2 and Vol. 3.

Career
Jesper started his career with the release of the promotional Idol single "Call Me Yours". It reached the number 1 position in Norwegian iTunes and fastly got 1 million plays on Spotify. After signing a joint deal with Sony Music and Eccentric, his first single "Superhero" was unveiled in June 2015. The song was certified Gold in Norway. It was followed by "Never Coming Back" in December. In 2016 he released another single, his first internationally, called "High". It was accompanied by a remix EP featuring remixes by Young Bombs and Sjur. It reached the 26 position on the Norwegian chart and went to the top spot on Hype Machine. The track also achieved the 2× Platinum certification in Norway. Jenset performed the song for a VG-lista show in Rådhusplassen. The single "Lies" came out later in the year, and an EP was announced to be released early 2017, however, the plans never fulfilled. A single named "Painkiller" was released in April 2017, with its music video premiering in May. After collaborating with CLMD and Justine Skye on "Never Wanna Lose You", the lead single of his upcoming EP "For Love." was unveiled. A music video for the track was shot in Cuba. His debut EP named Waves Vol. 1 featuring a duet with H.E.R. was released in April 2018.

In July he was featured on Polish DJ Gromee's single "One Last Time" which ended up being a hit in Poland, reaching the number 1 position and  being also certified 3× Platinum there. Another single called "Bad Vibrations" came out in September, with its music video directed by Frederic Esnault and featuring actress Emma Draleke premiering on October. It was followed by a feature on American DJ duo Lost Kings' single "Drunk as Hell", also accompanied by an animated video. The following single "Red Eyes", teasing his second EP, was released in January 2019. The second volume of his previous EP, Waves Vol. 2, was released on April 12, 2019 including another single named "Blue Flag / Fun Things".

In August he took part as the featuring artist of Madcon's single "No Lies", co-written by Danny Ocean. Its music video was shot in Marbella. On September 13, his first single in Norwegian "Hver Gang", featuring rapper Arif, was unveiled. It became certified Gold in April 2021. In October, he performed the song along "No Lies", with Madcon, and a cover of "Don't Leave" by British duo Snakehips and Danish singer MØ, with Kapteinen, at the NRK P3 studio. He also co-wrote Alan Walker and Ruben's 2020 single "Heading Home". After collaborating with Ylva on their joint single "Flame", as well as with Gromee in "Sweet Emotions", this later reaching the number 6 position in Poland, Jenset teased his third EP with the release of the double singles "Facade", accompanied by the track "I Like When We", and "Skinny Jeans", along "Someone Else". His third EP Vol. 3 was released in April 2020, as well as another single called "Love Me, I'm a Mess", which music video shot in Jesper's hometown and directed by his friend Magnus Furset, premiered in June. Later that year, Jenset featured on singles "Company" by Norwegian music producer Hvsun and "Not Like This" by Swiss DJ Gil Glaze. In 2021 he appeared on the track "Fucked Up Kids" from Chris Abolade and Amara's debut album Skrubbsår og skallebank.

On June 18, 2021 he came back with his second single in Norwegian "Skyt me i hjertet".

Discography

EPs
Waves, Vol. 1 (2018)
Waves, Vol. 2 (2019) 
Vol. 3 (2020)

Singles

As lead artist

As featured artist

Promotional singles

Other appearances

Writing credits

Music videos

References

1997 births
21st-century Norwegian singers
21st-century Norwegian male singers
Dance-pop musicians
English-language singers from Norway
Idol (Norwegian TV series) participants
Living people
Musicians from Molde
Norwegian pop singers
Norwegian songwriters
Synth-pop singers
Tropical house musicians